The Principal of the University of Glasgow is the working head of the University, acting as its chief executive. He is responsible for the day-to-day management of the University as well as its strategic planning and administration. The Principal is appointed by the University Court and is President of the Senate, the University's supreme academic body. The Principal is normally also created Vice-Chancellor of the University, conferring on him the degree-awarding powers of the Chancellor.

Professor Sir Anton Muscatelli succeeded Sir Muir Russell as Principal on 1 October 2009

History
From around the foundation of the University in the 15th century there existed the office of the Principal Regent, who was the senior regent of the University, with jurisdiction over the other regents and the students and responsible for day-to-day administration of the College. This office developed over the years, most notably through the Universities (Scotland) Acts, although the Principal remains the chief academic officer of the University, President of the Senate, and is permitted to award degrees by virtue of his status as Vice-Chancellor. Although the office of Principal is an academic post, the Principal himself is not always an academic, as was the case with Sir William Kerr Fraser and Sir Muir Russell.

List of Principals and Vice-Chancellors

 1460 - Duncan Bunch
 1475 - Walter Bunch
 1478 - John Goldsmith
 1478 - John Doby
 1480 - John Brown
 1483 - Walter Leslie
 1485 - George Crichton
 1488 - John Goldsmith
 1489 - John Doby
 1498 - Patrick Coventry
 1510 - Thomas Coutts
 1514 - David Melville
 1517 - David Abercromby
 1518 - John Mair
 1523 - James Lindsay
 1527 - Alexander Logan
 1540 - Alexander Hamilton

 1547 - John Hamilton
 1555 - John Houston
 1556 - John Davidson
 1574 - Andrew Melville
 1580 - Thomas Smeaton
 1585 - Patrick Sharp
 1615 - Robert Boyd
 1622 - John Cameron
 1626 - John Strang
 1651 - Robert Ramsay
 1653 - Patrick Gillespie
 1660 - Robert Baillie
 1662 - Edward Wright
 1684 - James Fall
 1690 - William Dunlop
 1701 - John Stirling
 1728 - Neil Campbell

 1761 - William Leechman
 1785 - Archibald Davidson
 1803 - William Taylor
 1823 - Duncan Macfarlan
 1858 - Thomas Barclay
 1873 - John Caird*
 1898 - Robert Story
 1909 - Sir Donald MacAlister
 1929 - Sir Robert Sangster Rait
 1936 - Sir Hector Hetherington*
 1961 - Sir Charles Wilson*
 1976 - Sir Alwyn Williams
 1988 - Sir William Kerr Fraser*
 1995 - Sir Graeme Davies
 2003 - Sir Muir Russell*
 2009 - Sir Anton Muscatelli*

(*) = denotes alumnus

See also
 Principal (university)
 Chancellor of the University of Glasgow
 Rector of the University of Glasgow
 Ancient university governance in Scotland

Resources

References